"U Don't Know Me (Like U Used To)" is a song by American recording artist Brandy Norwood. It was written by Isaac Phillips, Paris Davis, Sean Bryant, Rodney "Darkchild" Jerkins, and Norwood for her second studio album Never Say Never (1998). Production was handled by Jerkins, with additional production from Norwood.

The song was released as the album's fifth US single and sixth overall single from Never Say Never in September 1999. The track peaked at number 79 on the US Billboard Hot 100 and number 25 on the Hot R&B/Hip-Hop Songs, also reaching the top 20 of the UK Dance and UK R&B charts. A remix version of the track featuring female rappers Shaunta and Da Brat was accompanied by a remix EP entitled U Don't Know Me... Like U Used to – The Remix EP and a second music video, directed by Martin Weisz, featuring alternative visuals.

Critical reception
Billboard editor Chuck Taylor called "U Don't Know Me (Like U Used To)" a "summery, you-can-sing-along-with-the-hook record." He compared the favorably to Norwood's debut single "I Wanna Be Down," citing it "hypnotic," and found that her "rougher-than-usual vocals styles at times even sound like Mary J. Blige." Da’Shan Smith from Revolt declared the song one of Never Say Nevers "outstanding cuts" and found that it recalls "the '94 days of Brandy, but elevated it for the '98 present and subsequent future."

Music video
A music video for "U Don't Know Me (Like U Used To)" was filmed by German director Martin Weisz. A Matrix-themed clip, it begins with people walking in front of a building and later on a sidewalk. They pause periodically and speed up as Norwood sings. Weisz also directed a video for the remix version of the song, featuring Norwood, Shaunta, and Da Brat singing as people walk by on a pedestrian walk.

Track listings

Credits and personnel
Credits lifted from the album's liner notes.

 Brandy Norwood – writing, lead vocals, additional production
 Rodney Jerkins – writing, all music, production
 Sean Bryant – writing
 Paris Davis – writing
 Isaac Phillips – writing

 LaShawn Daniels – recording
 Brad Gilderman – recording
 Victor McCoy – recording
 Dexter Simmons – mixing

Charts

Release history

References

External links
 ForeverBrandy.com — official site

1998 songs
1999 singles
Atlantic Records singles
Brandy Norwood songs
Song recordings produced by Rodney Jerkins
Songs written by Brandy Norwood
Songs written by Rodney Jerkins